Twin reversed arterial perfusion sequence, also called TRAP sequence, TRAPS, or acardiac twinning, is a rare complication of monochorionic twin pregnancies. It is a severe variant of twin-to-twin transfusion syndrome (TTTS). In addition to the twins' blood systems being connected instead of independent, one twin, called the acardiac twin, TRAP fetus or acardius, is severely malformed. The heart is missing or deformed, hence the name "acardiac", as are the upper structures of the body. The legs may be partially present or missing, and internal structures of the torso are often poorly formed. The other twin is usually normal in appearance. The normal twin, called the pump twin, drives blood through both fetuses. It is called "reversed arterial perfusion" because in the acardiac twin the blood flows in a reversed direction.

TRAP sequence occurs in 1% of monochorionic twin pregnancies and 1 in 35,000 pregnancies overall.

Acardiac twin

The acardiac twin is a parasitic twin that fails to properly develop a heart, and therefore generally does not develop the upper structures of the body. The parasitic twin, little more than a torso with or without legs, receives its blood supply from the host twin by means of an umbilical cord-like structure (which often only has 2 blood vessels, instead of 3), much like a fetus in fetu, except the acardiac twin is outside the host twin's body. Although the reason is not fully understood, it is apparent that deoxygenated blood from the pump twin is perfused to the acardiac twin. The acardiac twin grows along with the pump twin, but due to inadequate oxygenation it is unable to develop the structures necessary for life, and presents with dramatic deformities.

Although no two acardiac twins are alike, twins with this disorder are grouped into 4 classes: Acephalus, anceps, acormus, and amorphus.

 Acephalus – The most common type, lacking a head, though it may have arms. Thoracic organs are generally absent, and disorganized & unidentifiable tissues take their place.
 Anceps – The acardius has most body parts, including a head with face and incomplete brain. Organs, though present, are crudely formed.
 Acormus – This type has no body only a head without a neck and the umbilical cord is attached to the head.
 Amorphus – This extreme form not only lacks a head and limbs, but may or may not lack any internal organs, and consists of tissue with vessels branching from the umbilical cord.
The acardiac amorphus twin might also have no heart at all and will consist of tissue, and the vessels would be from the umbilical cord. Some are a tumor only, and are attached to the umbilical cord without vessels from the umbilical cord which the tumor then dies away.

Pump twin
Generally the pump twin is structurally normal, although it is smaller than normal. Due to related problems including the rapid growth of the acardiac twin, polyhydramnios, umbilical cord entanglement and congestive heart failure due to high output, there is a high mortality rate for the pump twin if left untreated. The rate of fatality depends on the relative size of the acardiac twin. If the abnormal twin is greater than 50% of the size of the pump twin, the survival rate for the pump twin is only 10%.

Diagnosis
TRAP sequence can be diagnosed using obstetric ultrasound. Doppler interrogation will confirm that blood flow in the acardiac twin is in the reverse direction, entering via the umbilical cord artery and exiting through the vein.

Treatment
If left untreated, the pump twin will die in 50–75% of cases.

After diagnosis, ultrasound and amniocentesis are used to rule out genetic abnormalities in the pump twin. A procedure may then be performed which will stop the abnormal blood flow. The acardiac twin may be selectively removed. The umbilical cord of the acardiac twin may be surgically cut, separating it from the pump twin, a procedure called fetoscopic cord occlusion. Or a radio-frequency ablation needle may be used to coagulate the blood in the acardiac twin's umbilical cord. This last procedure is the least invasive. These procedures greatly increase the survival chances of the pump twin, to about 80%.

The pump twin will be monitored for signs of heart failure with echocardiograms. If the pump twin's condition deteriorates, the obstetrician may recommend early delivery. Otherwise, the pregnancy continues normally. Vaginal birth is possible unless the fetus is in distress, although it is recommended that the delivery take place at a hospital with NICU capabilities.

References

External links
thefetus.net
gfmer.ch

Parasitic twin